America Is Elsewhere: The Noir Tradition in the Age of Consumer Culture is a book written by Erik Dussere and published by Oxford University Press on 1 November 2013 which later went on to win the Edgar Award for Best Critical / Biographical in 2014.

External links 
 Book Review as featured on The University of Chicago Press
 As featured on Oxford Scholarship Online
 Noir and Consumer Culture

References 

Edgar Award-winning works
2013 non-fiction books
Oxford University Press books